Entasaf Al-Layl is the first album by Ahmed Bukhatir, an Islamic munshid. It was released in 2000.

Track listing

Notes and references

External links
Official Website

Ahmed Bukhatir albums
2000 albums